Asanoa hainanensis is a Gram-positive and non-motile bacterium from the genus Asanoa which has been isolated from the rhizospheric soil of the fern Acrostichum speciosum from Wenchang, China.

References 

Micromonosporaceae
Bacteria described in 2011